Ittenthal was a municipality in the district of Laufenburg in the canton of Aargau in Switzerland.  On 1 January 2010, Ittenthal merged into the municipality of Kaisten.

The historical population is given in the following table:

References

External links

 

Former municipalities of Aargau
Populated places disestablished in 2010